Odin Brewery was a brewery in Viborg, Denmark which existed from 1832 to 1988; at that time it was the oldest brewery in Denmark.

In February 2019 a small amount of Odin beers from 1906 were discovered under the old brewery.

References

1988 disestablishments in Denmark
Defunct breweries of Denmark
Companies disestablished in 1988
Danish companies established in 1832